Azerbaijani literature is written in Azerbaijani, a Turkic language, which is the official state language of the Republic of Azerbaijan, where the North Azerbaijani variety is spoken. It is also natively spoken in Iran, where the South Azerbaijani variety is used, and is particularly spoken in the northwestern historic region of Azerbaijan. Azerbaijani is also spoken natively in Russia (especially Dagestan), Georgia and Turkey. While the majority of Azerbaijani people live in Iran, modern Azerbaijani literature is overwhelmingly produced in the Republic of Azerbaijan, where the language has official status. Three scripts are used for writing the language: Azerbaijani Latin script in the Republic of Azerbaijan, Arabic script in Iran and Cyrillic script formerly used in Soviet Azerbaijan.

The earliest development of Azerbaijani literature is closely associated with Anatolian Turkish, written in Perso-Arabic script. Examples of its detachment date to the 14th century or earlier. Several major authors helped to develop Azerbaijani literature from the 14th century until the 17th century and poetry figures prominently in their works. Towards the end of the 19th century, popular literature such as newspapers began to be published in Azerbaijani language. The production of written works in Azerbaijani was banned in Soviet Azerbaijan Stalin's "Red Terror" campaign targeted thousands of Azerbaijani writers, journalists, teachers, intellectuals and others and resulted in the changing of the Azerbaijani alphabet into one with a Cyrillic alphabet.

Modern Azerbaijani literature is almost exclusively produced in the Republic of Azerbaijan and despite being widely spoken in Iran, Azerbaijani is not formally taught in schools nor are publications in Azerbaijani easily available.

The two traditions of Azerbaijani literature
Throughout most of its history, Azerbaijani literature has been rather sharply divided into two rather different traditions, neither of which exercised much influence upon the other until the 19th century. The first of these two traditions is Azerbaijani folk literature, and the second is Azerbaijani written literature.

For most of the history of Azerbaijani literature, the salient difference between the folk and the written traditions has been the variety of language employed. The folk tradition, by and large, was oral and remained free of the influence of Persian and Arabic literature, and consequently of those literatures' respective languages. In folk poetry—which is by far the tradition's dominant genre—this basic fact led to two major consequences in terms of poetic style:
 the poetic meters employed in the folk poetic tradition were different, being quantitative (i.e., syllabic) verse, as opposed to the qualitative verse employed in the written poetic tradition;
 the basic structural unit of folk poetry became the quatrain (Azerbaijani: dördmisralı) rather than the couplets (Azerbaijani: beyt) more commonly employed in written poetry.

Furthermore, Azerbaijani folk poetry has always had an intimate connection with song—most of the poetry was, in fact, expressly composed so as to be sung—and so became to a great extent inseparable from the tradition of Azerbaijani folk music.

In contrast to the tradition of Azerbaijani folk literature tended to embrace the influence of Persian and Arabic literature. To some extent, this can be seen as far back as the Seljuk period in the late 11th to early 14th centuries, where official business was conducted in the Persian language, rather than in Turkic, and where a court poet such as Dehhanî—who served under the 13th century sultan Ala ad-Din Kay Qubadh I—wrote in a language highly inflected with Persian.

With the founding of Safavid Iran in the 16th century, it continued this tradition. The standard poetic forms—for poetry was as much the dominant genre in the written tradition as in the folk tradition—were derived either directly from the Persian literary tradition (the qəzəl غزل; the məsnəvî مثنوی), or indirectly through Persian from the Arabic (the qəsîde قصيده). However, the decision to adopt these poetic forms wholesale led to two important further consequences:
 the poetic meters (Azerbaijani: aruz) of Persian poetry were adopted;
 Persian- and Arabic-based words were brought into the Azerbaijani language in great numbers, as Turkic words rarely worked well within the system of Persian poetic meter. This style of writing under Persian and Arabic influence came to be known as "Divan literature" (Azerbaijani: divan ədəbiyatı), dîvân (ديوان) being the Azerbaijani word referring to the collected works of a poet.

Azerbaijani folk literature
Azerbaijani folk literature is an oral tradition deeply rooted, in its form, in Central Asian nomadic traditions. However, in its themes, Azerbaijani folk literature reflects the problems peculiar to a settling (or settled) people who have abandoned the nomadic lifestyle. One example of this is the series of folktales surrounding the figure of Keloğlan, a young boy beset with the difficulties of finding a wife, helping his mother to keep the family house intact, and dealing with the problems caused by his neighbors. Another example is the rather mysterious figure of Nasreddin, a trickster who often plays jokes, of a sort, on his neighbors.

Nasreddin also reflects another significant change that had occurred between the days when the Turkic people were nomadic and the days when they had largely become settled in Azerbaijan and Anatolia; namely, Nasreddin is a Muslim imam. The Turkic people had first become an Islamic people sometime around the ninth or tenth century, as is evidenced from the clear Islamic influence on the 11th century Karakhanid work the Kutadgu Bilig ("Wisdom of Royal Glory"), written by Yusuf Has Hajib. The religion henceforth came to exercise an enormous influence on Turkic society and literature, particularly the heavily mystically oriented Sufi and Shi'a varieties of Islam. The Sufi influence, for instance, can be seen clearly not only in the tales concerning Nasreddin but also in the works of Yunus Emre, a towering figure in Turkic literature and a poet who lived at the end of the 13th and beginning of the 14th century, probably in the Karamanid state in south-central Anatolia. The Shi'a influence, on the other hand, can be seen extensively in the tradition of the aşıqs, or ozans, who are roughly akin to medieval European minstrels and who traditionally have had a strong connection with the Alevi faith, which can be seen as something of a homegrown Turkic variety of Shi'a Islam. It is, however, important to note that in Turkic culture, such a neat division into Sufi and Shi'a is scarcely possible: for instance, Yunus Emre is considered by some to have been an Alevi, while the entire Turkic aşık/ozan tradition is permeated with the thought of the Bektashi Sufi order, which is itself a blending of Shi'a and Sufi concepts. The word aşıq (literally, "lover") is in fact the term used for first-level members of the Bektashi order.

Because the Azerbaijani folk literature tradition extends in a more or less unbroken line from about the 13–15th century to today, it is perhaps best to consider the tradition from the perspective of genre. There are three basic genres in the tradition: epic; folk poetry; and folklore.

The epic tradition
The Turkic epic has its roots in the Central Asian epic tradition that gave rise to the Book of Dede Korkut; written in Azerbaijani language.  The form developed from the oral traditions of the Oghuz Turks (a branch of the Turkic peoples which migrated towards western Asia and eastern Europe through Transoxiana, beginning in the ninth century). The Book of Dede Korkut endured in the oral tradition of the Oghuz Turks after settling in Azerbaijan and Anatolia. Alpamysh is an earlier epic, translated into English and available online.

The Book of Dede Korkut was the primary element of the Azerbaijani epic tradition in the Caucasus and Anatolia for several centuries: 11th–12th centuries. Concurrent to the Book of Dede Korkut was the so-called Epic of Köroğlu, which concerns the adventures of Rüşen Ali ("Köroğlu", or "son of the blind man") as he exacted revenge for the blinding of his father. The origins of this epic are somewhat more mysterious than those of the Book of Dede Korkut: many believe it to have arisen in Azerbaijan sometime between the 15th and 17th centuries; more reliable testimony, though, seems to indicate that the story is nearly as old as that of the Book of Dede Korkut, dating from around the dawn of the 11th century. Complicating matters somewhat is the fact that Köroğlu is also the name of a poet of the aşık/ozan tradition.

Folk poetry

The folk poetry tradition in Azerbaijani literature, as indicated above, was strongly influenced by the Islamic Sufi and Shi'a traditions. Furthermore, as partly evidenced by the prevalence of the still existent aşık/ozan tradition, the dominant element in Turkic folk poetry has always been song. The development of folk poetry in Turkic —which began to emerge in the 13th century with such important writers as Yunus Emre, Sultan Veled, and Şeyyâd Hamza—was given a great boost when, on 13 May 1277, Karamanoğlu Mehmet Bey declared Turkic the official state language of Anatolia's powerful Karamanid state; subsequently, many of the tradition's greatest poets would continue to emerge from this region.

There are, broadly speaking, two traditions of Azerbaijani folk poetry:
 the aşık/ozan tradition, which—although much influenced by religion, as mentioned above—was for the most part a secular tradition;
 the explicitly religious tradition, which emerged from the gathering places (tekkes) of the Sufi religious orders and Shi'a groups.

Much of the poetry and song of the aşık/ozan tradition, being almost exclusively oral until the 19th century, remains anonymous. There are, however, a few well-known aşıks from before that time whose names have survived together with their works: the aforementioned Köroğlu (16th century); Karacaoğlan (1606–1689), who may be the best-known of the pre-19th century aşıks; Dadaloğlu (1785–1868), who was one of the last of the great aşıks before the tradition began to dwindle somewhat in the late 19th century; and several others. The aşıks were essentially minstrels who travelled through Anatolia performing their songs on the bağlama, a mandolin-like instrument whose paired strings are considered to have a symbolic religious significance in Alevi/Bektashi culture. Despite the decline of the aşık/ozan tradition in the 19th century, it experienced a significant revival in the 20th century thanks to such outstanding figures as Aşık Veysel Şatıroğlu (1894–1973), Aşık Mahzuni Şerif (1938–2002), Neşet Ertaş (1938–2012), and many others.

The explicitly religious folk tradition of tekke literature shared a similar basis with the aşık/ozan tradition in that the poems were generally intended to be sung, generally in religious gatherings, making them somewhat akin to Western hymns (Azerbaijani ilahi). One major difference from the aşık/ozan tradition, however, is that—from the very beginning—the poems of the tekke tradition were written down. This was because they were produced by revered religious figures in the literate environment of the tekke, as opposed to the milieu of the aşık/ozan tradition, where the majority could not read or write. The major figures in the tradition of tekke literature are: Yunus Emre (1238–1321), who is one of the most important figures in all of Turkish literature; Süleyman Çelebi, who wrote a highly popular long poem called Vesîletü'n-Necât (وسيلة النجاة "The Means of Salvation", but more commonly known as the Mevlid), concerning the birth of the Islamic prophet Muhammad; Kaygusuz Abdal, who is widely considered the founder of Alevi/Bektashi literature; and Pir Sultan Abdal, whom many consider to be the pinnacle of that literature.

Safavid literature
The two primary streams of Safavid written literature are poetry and prose. Of the two, poetry—specifically, Divan poetry—was by far the dominant stream. Moreover, until the 19th century, Safavid prose did not contain any examples of fiction; that is, there were no counterparts to, for instance, the European romance, short story, or novel (though analogous genres did, to some extent, exist in both the Turkish folk tradition and in Divan poetry).

Divan poetry

Safavid Divan poetry was a highly ritualized and symbolic art form. From the Persian poetry that largely inspired it, it inherited a wealth of symbols whose meanings and interrelationships—both of similitude (مراعات نظير mura'ât-i nazîr / تناسب
tenâsüb) and opposition (تضاد tezâd)—were more or less prescribed. Examples of prevalent symbols that, to some extent, oppose one another include, among others:
 the nightingale (بلبل bülbül) — the rose (ﮔل gül)
 the world (جهان cihan; عالم ‘âlem) — the rosegarden (ﮔﻠﺴﺘﺎن gülistan; ﮔﻠﺸﻦ gülşen)
 the ascetic (زاهد zâhid) — the dervish (درويش derviş)

As the opposition of "the ascetic" and "the dervish" suggests, Divan poetry—much like Azerbaijani folk poetry—was heavily influenced by Shia Islam. One of the primary characteristics of Divan poetry, however—as of the Persian poetry before it—was its mingling of the mystical Sufi element with a profane and even erotic element. Thus, the pairing of "the nightingale" and "the rose" simultaneously suggests two different relationships:
 the relationship between the fervent lover ("the nightingale") and the inconstant beloved ("the rose")
 the relationship between the individual Sufi practitioner (who is often characterized in Sufism as a lover) and God (who is considered the ultimate source and object of love)

Similarly, "the world" refers simultaneously to the physical world and to this physical world considered as the abode of sorrow and impermanence, while "the rosegarden" refers simultaneously to a literal garden and to the garden of Paradise. "The nightingale", or suffering lover, is often seen as situated—both literally and figuratively—in "the world", while "the rose", or beloved, is seen as being in "the rose-garden".

Ottoman and Safavid divan poetry heavily influenced each other. As for the development of Divan poetry over the more than 500 years of its existence, that is—as the Ottomanist Walter G. Andrews points out—a study still in its infancy; clearly defined movements and periods have not yet been decided upon. Early in the history of the tradition, the Persian influence was very strong, but this was mitigated somewhat through the influence of poets such as the Azerbaijani Nesîmî (1369–1417) and the Uzbek/Uyghur Ali Şîr Nevâî (1441–1501), both of whom offered strong arguments for the poetic status of the Turkic languages as against the much-venerated Persian. Partly as a result of such arguments, Divan poetry in its strongest period—from the 16th to the 18th centuries—came to display a unique balance of Persian and Turkic elements, until the Persian influence began to predominate again in the early 19th century.

Azerbaijani poets although they had been inspired and influenced by classical Persian poetry, it would be a superficial judgment to consider the former as blind imitators of the latters, as is often done. A limited vocabulary and common technique, and the same world of imagery and subject matter based mainly on Islamic sources were shared by all poets of Islamic literature.

Despite the lack of certainty regarding the stylistic movements and periods of Divan poetry, however, certain highly different styles are clear enough, and can perhaps be seen as exemplified by certain poets:

 Fuzûlî (1494–1556); a unique poet who wrote with equal skill in Azerbaijani, Persian, and Arabic, and who came to be as influential in Persian as in Divan poetry
 Bâkî (1526–1600); a poet of great rhetorical power and linguistic subtlety whose skill in using the pre-established tropes of the Divan tradition is quite representative of the poetry in the time of Süleyman the Magnificent
 Nef‘î (1572–1635); a poet considered the master of the kasîde (a kind of panegyric), as well as being known for his harshly satirical poems, which led to his execution
 Nâbî (1642–1712); a poet who wrote a number of socially oriented poems critical of the stagnation period of Ottoman history
 Nedîm (1681–1730); a revolutionary poet of the Tulip Era of Ottoman history, who infused the rather élite and abstruse language of Divan poetry with numerous simpler, populist elements
 Şeyh Gâlib (1757–1799); a poet of the Mevlevî Sufi order whose work is considered the culmination of the highly complex so-called "Indian style" (سبك هندى sebk-i hindî)

The vast majority of Divan poetry was lyric in nature: either gazels (which make up the greatest part of the repertoire of the tradition), or kasîdes. There were, however, other common genres, most particularly the mesnevî, a kind of verse romance and thus a variety of narrative poetry; the two most notable examples of this form are the Leylî vü Mecnun (ليلى و مجنون) of Fuzûlî and the Hüsn ü Aşk (حسن و عشق; "Beauty and Love") of Şeyh Gâlib.

Early Safavid prose
Until the 19th century, Safavid prose never managed to develop to the extent that contemporary Divan poetry did. A large part of the reason for this was that much prose was expected to adhere to the rules of sec''' (سجع, also transliterated as seci), or rhymed prose, a type of writing descended from the Arabic saj' and which prescribed that between each adjective and noun in a sentence, there must be a rhyme.

Nevertheless, there was a tradition of prose in the literature of the time. This tradition was exclusively nonfictional in nature—the fiction tradition was limited to narrative poetry. A number of such nonfictional prose genres developed:
 the târih (تاريخ), or history, a tradition in which there are many notable writers, including the 15th-century historian Aşıkpaşazâde and the 17th-century historians Kâtib Çelebi and Naîmâ
 the seyâhatnâme (سياحت نامه), or travelogue, of which the outstanding example is the 17th-century Seyahâtnâme of Evliya Çelebi
 the sefâretnâme (سفارت نامه), a related genre specific to the journeys and experiences of an Ottoman ambassador, and which is best exemplified by the 1718–1720 Paris Sefâretnâmesi of Yirmisekiz Mehmed Çelebi, ambassador to the court of Louis XV of France
 the siyâsetnâme (سياست نامه), a kind of political treatise describing the functionings of state and offering advice for rulers, an early Seljuk example of which is the 11th-century Siyāsatnāma, written in Persian by Nizam al-Mulk, vizier to the Seljuk rulers Alp Arslan and Malik Shah I
 the tezkîre (تذکره), a collection of short biographies of notable figures, some of the most notable of which were the 16th-century tezkiretü'ş-şuarâs (تذكرة الشعرا), or biographies of poets, by Latîfî and Aşık Çelebi
 the münşeât (منشآت), a collection of writings and letters similar to the Western tradition of belles-lettres the münâzara (مناظره), a collection of debates of either a religious or a philosophical nature

Classical era
The earliest known figure in Azerbaijani literature is Izzeddin Hasanoghlu, who composed a diwan of Azerbaijani and Persian ghazals.A.Caferoglu, "Adhari(Azeri)",in Encyclopedia of Islam, (new edition), Vol. 1, (Leiden, 1986) In Persian ghazals he used the pen-name Pur-e Hasan, while his Turkic ghazals were composed under his own name of Hasanoghlu.

In the 15th century, Azerbaijan was under the control of Qara Qoyunlu and Aq Qoyunlu Turkic tribal confederacies. Among the poets of this period were Kadi Burhan al-Din, Haqiqi (pen-name of Jahan-shah Qara Qoyunlu), and Habibi. The end of the 14th century was also the period of starting literary activity of Imadaddin Nesimi, one of the greatest Azerbaijani Hurufi mystical poets of the late 14th and early 15th centuries and one of the most prominent early Divan masters in Turkic literary history, who also composed poetry in Persian and Arabic.

The Divan and Ghazal styles, introduced by Nesimi in Azerbaijani poetry in the 15th century,  were further developed by poets Qasem-e Anvar, Fuzuli and Khatai (pen-name of Safavid Shah Ismail I).

The book Dede Qorqud which consists of two manuscripts copied in the 16th century, was not written earlier than the 15th century.İlker Evrim Binbaş,Encyclopædia Iranica, "Oguz Khan Narratives" , accessed October, 2010.  "The Ketāb-e Dede Qorqut, which is a collection of twelve stories reflecting the oral traditions of the Turkmens in the 15th-century eastern Anatolia, is also called Oḡuz-nāma"  It is a collection of twelve stories reflecting the oral tradition of Oghuz nomads.  Since the author is buttering up both the Aq Qoyunlu and Ottoman rulers, it has been suggested that the composition belongs to someone living between the Aq Qoyunlu and Ottoman Empire.  Geoffery Lewis  believes an older substratum of these oral traditions dates to conflicts between the ancient Oghuz and their Turkish rivals in Central Asia (the Pechenegs and the Kipchaks), however this substratum has been clothed in references to the 14th-century campaigns of the Aq Qoyunlu Confederation of Turkic tribes against the Georgians, the Abkhaz, and the Greeks in Trabzon.

The 16th-century poet, Muhammed Fuzuli produced his timeless philosophical and lyrical Qazals in Arabic, Persian, and Azerbaijani. Benefiting immensely from the fine literary traditions of his environment, and building upon the legacy of his predecessors, Fizuli was to become the leading literary figure of his society. His major works include The Divan of Ghazals and The Qasidas.

In the 16th century, Azerbaijani literature further flourished with the development of Ashik poetic genre of bards. During the same period, under the pen-name of Khatāī ( for sinner) Shah Ismail I wrote about 1400 verses in Azerbaijani, which were later published as his Divan. A unique literary style known as qoshma ( for improvisation) was introduced in this period, and developed by Shah Ismail and later by his son and successor, Shah Tahmasp and Tahmasp I.

In the span of the 17th century and 18th century, Fizuli's unique genres as well Ashik  poetry were taken up by prominent poets and writers such as Qovsi of Tabriz, Shah Abbas Sani, Agha Mesih Shirvani, Nishat, Molla Vali Vidadi, Molla Panah Vagif, Amani, Zafar and others.

Several documented versions of Koroglu epic remain at the Institute for Manuscripts of the National Academy of Sciences of Azerbaijan.

The nineteenth century onward

Azerbaijani literature of the nineteenth century was profoundly influenced by the Russian conquest of the territory of present-day Republic of Azerbaijan, as a result of Russo-Persian Wars, which separated the territory of nowadays Azerbaijan, from Iran. Azerbaijani-Turkish writer Ali bey Hüseynzade's poem Turan inspired Turanism and pan-Turkism among Turkish intellectuals during the First World War and early Republican period. Hüseynzade emphasized the linguistic bonds between the Turks, who were Muslim, and the Christian people of Hungary.

The fascination with language is seen in the work of Mirzə Cəlil Məmmədquluzadə who was an influential figure in the development of Azerbaijani nationalism in Soviet Azerbaijan. Məmmədqulzadə, who was also the founder of the satirical journal Molla Nasraddin, wrote the play Anamın kitabı (My Mother's Book) in 1920 in Karabakh. It was about a wealthy widow who lived with her three sons who had graduated from universities in St. Petersburg, Istanbul and Najaf. The brothers had adapted to the culture and languages of the cities in which they were educated and were not able to understand one another or their mother. Their sister, Gülbahar, only able to read in Muslim language (müsəlmanca savadlı), burns her brothers' books at the end. After the Russian vocabularies, Ottoman poems, and Persian astronomy books are destroyed, the only book that survives Gülbahar's "cultural revolution" is a notebook, written in Azerbaijani language, containing wishes for the unity of the family.

Soviet Azerbaijani literature
Under the Soviet rule, particularly during Joseph Stalin's reign, Azerbaijani writers who did not conform to the party line were persecuted. Bolsheviks sought to destroy the nationalist intellectual elite established during the short-lived Azerbaijan Democratic Republic, and in the 1930s, many writers and intellectuals were essentially turned into mouthpieces of Soviet propaganda.

Although there were those who did not follow to the official party line in their writings. Among them were Mahammad Hadi, Abbas Sahhat, Huseyn Javid, Abdulla Shaig, Jafar Jabbarly, and Mikayil Mushfig, who in their search for a means of resistance, turned to the clandestine methodologies of Sufism, which taught spiritual discipline as a way to combat temptation.

When Nikita Khrushchev came to power in 1953 following Stalin's death, the harsh focus on propaganda began to fade, and writers began to branch off in new directions, primarily focused on uplifting prose that would be a source of hope to Azerbaijanis living under a totalitarian regime.

Iranian Azerbaijani literature
An influential piece of post-World War II Azerbaijani poetry, Heydar Babaya Salam (Greetings to Heydar Baba) is considered to be a pinnacle in Azerbaijani literature was written by Iranian Azerbaijani poet Mohammad Hossein Shahriar. This poem, published in Tabriz in 1954 and written in colloquial Azerbaijani, became popular among Azerbaijanis in Iran's northwestern historic region of Azerbaijan and Republic of Azerbaijan. In Heydar Babaya Salam'', Shahriar expressed his Azerbaijani identity attached to his homeland, language, and culture. Heydar Baba is a hill near Khoshknab, the native village of the poet.

Modern literature 
From writers of modern Azerbaijan, the most famous were the screenwriter Rustam Ibragimbekov and the author of the detective novels Chingiz Abdullayev, who wrote exclusively in Russian.

Poetry is represented by famous poets Nariman Hasanzade, Khalil Rza, Sabir Novruz, Vagif Samadoglu, Nusrat Kesemenli, Ramiz Rovshan, Hamlet Isakhanli, Zalimkhan Yagub, etc. Among modern Azerbaijani playwrights, F. Goja, Elchin, K. Abdullah, A. Masud, G. Miralamov, E. Huseynbeyli, A. Ragimov, R. Akber, A. Amirley, and others.

The framework of the new Azerbaijani prose is expanded by elements of the detective, fiction, anti-utopia, Turkic mythology, eastern surrealism. Among the writers working in this genre one can name such writers as Anar, M. Suleymanly, N. Rasulzade, R. Rahmanoglu. The new Azerbaijani realism began to gain momentum when young prose writers began to turn increasingly to national history and ethnic memory. In this regard, it is worth noting the historical and synthetic novel "The Thirteenth Apostle, or One Hundred Forty-First Don Juan" by Elchin Huseynbeyli and the historical novels "Shah Abbas" and "Nadir Shah" by Yunus Oguz.

After gaining independence in Azerbaijan, an important role was played by the liberation of the occupied territories, love of the Motherland and justice. One of the most famous books about Karabakh are: "Karabakh – mountains call us" Elbrus Orujev, "Azerbaijan Diary: A Rogue Reporter's Adventures in an Oil-Rich, War-Torn, Post-Soviet Republic" Thomas Goltz "History of Azerbaijan on documents and Ziya Bunyatov. The Karabakh war left its misprint in the modern Azerbaijani literature: such writers as G. Anargizy, M. Suleymanly, A. Rahimov, S. Ahmedli, V. Babally, K. Nezirli, A. Kuliev, A. Abbas, M. Bekirli turned to the themes of the fate of refugees, longing for the lost Shusha, Khojaly massacre, cruelty of war, etc.

To support young writers in 2009, the "Ali and Nino" publishing house established the National Book Award of Azerbaijan, which annually monitors novelties of literature, and gives awards to the most successful samples of literature and works released over the past year. The jury of the award includes well-known Azerbaijani writers, cultural figures.

Azerbaijani diaspora

Government influence

Cultural laws of the Republic of Azerbaijan 
Creative persons, winners of festival and competition who have special services in the development and promotion of culture, are awarded with honorary titles and awards in the form determined by the relevant executive authority.

Persons who have exceptional services in the development of Azerbaijani culture are awarded by orders and medals in accordance with Article 109.2 of the Constitution of Azerbaijan.

State support in the field of literature 
The literary editions of the Union of Writers – " Newspaper of Literature", "Azerbaijan", "Ulduz", "Gobustan" and "Literaturniy Azerbaijan " in Russian began to operate after the X congress of the Union of Writers of Azerbaijan, which was held in October 1997 with the participation of Heydar Aliyev. Also, Mingachevir, Aran, and Moscow departments of the Writers Union of Azerbaijan were created after that congress.

For the first time in 1995, the "Istiglal" order was given to Bakhtiyar Vahabzade by Heydar Aliyev, as well as  Mammad Araz and Khalil Rza Uluturk were also awarded the "Istiglal" Order.

Literary activity of National writer – Anar Rzayev has been awarded the “Heydar Aliyev Prize” by Ilham Aliyev.

The book "Heydar Aliyev and Azerbaijan Literature", prepared by the ANAS Institute of Literature in 2010, was awarded the State Prize in 2014. The publicist novel of "Heydar Aliyev: Personality and Time" with 6 volumes written by Elmira Akhundova and in 2016 Fikrat Goca’s Works – 10 volume were awarded that State Prize.

Sabir Rustamkhanli, Nariman Hasanzade and Zelimkhan Yaqub were awarded “National poets” by Ilham Aliyev in 2005. Maqsud and Rustam Ibrahimbeyov's brothers, Movlud Suleymanli were awarded the title of "National Writer" by President. In general, there are 22 “National poets” and 25 “National writers” in the country. Chingiz Abdullayev was awarded both the honorary title "Glory" and the "National Writer" by the decree of the President in 2009 when he was 50 years old.

Ilham Aliyev signed a decree on holding 100th anniversary of S. Vurgun, S.Rustam, M. Jalal, M.Huseyn, A.Alekbarzade, M.Ibrahimov, R. Rza, Ilyas Afandiyev. As well as he signed a decree on holding 100th anniversary of Almas Yildirim on April 16, 2007, and Mikayil Mushfiq in 2008 who are the victims of repression. Ilham Aliyev signed decrees to hold the 125th, 130th and 135th anniversary of Hussein Javid.

S.Rahimov and M.Adadzadeh were celebrated the 110th anniversary, M. Rasulzadeh – the 130th anniversary, A.Huseynzade – 150th anniversary. The celebration of these writers' anniversaries at the state level also serves to promote them throughout the world.

On November 10, 2008 Mehriban Aliyeva, President of the Heydar Aliyev Foundation, spoke at the UNESCO headquarters in Paris on the occasion of the 100th anniversary of M.Pashayev.

Hundreds of books have been published based on the decree of the President dated 12 January 2004 on “The implementation of mass editions in the Azerbaijani language (Latin). In addition, 150 volumes of examples from World Literature Library has been translated.

Literature museums 
President Ilham Aliyev attended the opening of the Literature Museum in Gazakh. The busts of 12 national heroes and famous writers from Qazakh were erected at the park, where the museum is located. The president signed an order on June 1, 2012, to allocate from the Presidential Reserve Fund AZN 5 million to construct this museum.

See also
 Azerbaijani people
 Azerbaijani language
 Azerbaijani-language poets
 Nizami Museum of Azerbaijan Literature

References

Further reading

External links
 The Book of Dede Korkut (English translation) 
 "Literature" by Azeri.org
 Azeri Literature
 Azerbaijani Literature and Authors, part of Virginia Tech University Libraries Slavic, East European, and Former USSR Resources page
 Aesopian literary dimensions in Azerbaijani literature of the Soviet period, 1920—1990, by Maliheh Shams Tyrrell, Columbia University, Faculty Advisor: Edward Allworth, Date: 1999
 The Institute of Literature named after Nizami of the Azerbaijan National Academy of Sciences
 The Use of Spoken Russian in Azerbaijani Literature, by Andreas Tietze, Slavic Review, Vol. 22, No. 4 (Dec., 1963), pp. 727–733
 Azeribooks project of the United States Public Affairs Section
 Azerbaijan National Bibliography (1987–1991)
 Kocharli, Nigar: "The Business of Literature in Azerbaijan" in the Caucasus Analytical Digest No. 14

 
Azerbaijani language
Azerbaijan (Iran)
Azerbaijani culture